Soucis is a town on the island of Saint Lucia; it is located on the western side of the island, near Morne Fortune.

Towns in Saint Lucia